This is a list of electronic music genres, consisting of genres of electronic music, primarily created with electronic musical instruments or electronic music technology. A distinction has been made between sound produced using electromechanical means and that produced using electronic technology. Examples of electromechanical sound producing devices include the telharmonium, Hammond organ, electric piano, and the electric guitar. Purely electronic sound production can be achieved using devices such as the theremin, sound synthesizer, and computer. Genre, however, is not always dependent on instrumentation.

In its early development, electronic music was associated almost exclusively with Western art music, but from the late 1960s, the availability of affordable music technology—particularly of synthesizers—meant that music produced using electronic means became increasingly common in the popular domains of rock and pop music and classical music, resulting in major electronically based subgenres. After the definition of MIDI in 1982 and the development of digital audio, the creation of purely electronic sounds and their manipulation became much simpler. As a result, synthesizers came to dominate the pop music of the early 1980s. In the late 1980s, electronic dance music (EDM) records made using only electronic instruments became increasingly popular, resulting in a proliferation of electronic genres, subgenres, and scenes. In the new millennium, as computer technology became even more accessible and music software advanced, interacting with music production technology made it possible to create music that has some similarities and some differences to traditional musical performance practices, leading to further developments and rapidly evolving subgenres.

Genres

 Acid trance
 Balearic trance
 Dream trance
 
 Hands up
 Goa trance
 Nitzhonot
 Hard trance
 
 Psychedelic trance
 Dark psytrance
 Full-on
 
 Progressive psytrance
 Suomisaundi
 Tech trance
 Uplifting trance
 Vocal trance
 UK garage
 2-step garage
 Bassline
 Breakstep
 Dubstep
 Brostep
 Post-dubstep
 Reggaestep
 Riddim
 Future garage
 Grime
 Grindie
 Speed garage
 UK funky
 Funkstep
 Wonky
 Video game music
 Chiptune
 Bitpop
 Skweee
 Nintendocore
 FM synthesis
 Sequencer music
}}

Remix derivatives
 Chopped and screwed
 Disco edits
 Nightcore
 Tecno brega
 Weird SoundCloud

Broader genre groups 
 Electronic dance music
 Christian electronic dance music
 Rave music

See also
 Ishkur's Guide to Electronic Music
 List of electronic music festivals
 List of electronic musicians
 Dance music
 List of hip hop genres
 List of industrial music genres
 List of trance genres
 Styles of house music
 List of subcultures
 Timeline of electronic music genres

Notes

External links 

 Graph of genres

 
Electronic Music